The Cheek to Cheek Tour was a co-headlining tour by American singers Tony Bennett and Lady Gaga in support of their album, Cheek to Cheek (2014). The tour, which began with a two-night run at The Cosmopolitan in Las Vegas, played a total of 36 shows across Europe and North America during the first half of 2015. Many of the tour's shows were part of music festivals, such as the Ravinia Festival, the Copenhagen Jazz Festival, the North Sea Jazz Festival, and the Gent Jazz Festival. The Cheek to Cheek Tour grossed $15.3 million from 27 shows with a total attendance of 176,267.

Background
In September 2012, American jazz singer Tony Bennett confirmed to Rolling Stone that he would record and release a jazz album with singer Lady Gaga. On July 29, 2014, the duo appeared on Today to formally announce their collaboration, titled Cheek to Cheek, with the release date in the United States as September 23, 2014. Following the announcement of the release, a mini concert was held at the Rose Theater of Lincoln Center for the Performing Arts. Titled Tony Bennett and Lady Gaga: Cheek to Cheek Live!, the concert aired on PBS on October 24, 2014, and a DVD of the performance was released on January 20, 2015. In the meantime, Gaga also finished her world tour, ArtRave: The Artpop Ball in support of her third studio album Artpop (2013); the tour ended on November 24, 2014.

After promoting Cheek to Cheek through multiple avenues like television appearances, live performances, advertisements and campaigns, Bennett confirmed that he and Gaga would tour jazz festivals in 2015, supporting the album. According to him, Gaga was tired from playing bigger venues, and wanted to have the tour visit smaller arenas. Bennett also explained that he was accustomed to playing in acoustic music halls and outdoor theaters, so Gaga had been looking at such options.

Development

On New Year's Eve 2014, the duo started the Cheek to Cheek Tour by performing at the Cosmopolitan Casino of Las Vegas. They also performed at the 57th Annual Grammy Awards and its scheduled a post-Grammy concert on February 8, 2015, at the Wiltern Theatre in Los Angeles, just after the conclusion of the ceremony. More shows were scheduled in 2015, including Hollywood Bowl on May 30; the Royal Albert Hall in London on June 8; and Radio City Music Hall in New York City on June 19. Many of the tour's shows were part of music festivals, such as the Ravinia Festival, the Copenhagen Jazz Festival, the North Sea Jazz Festival, and the Gent Jazz Festival. Besides the shows scheduled, the duo also performed at the WellChild Charity concert in London, the Plaza Hotel in New York, and at a fundraiser in  support of Hillary Clinton's presidential campaign.

For the show, the stage was decorated in a simple manner with just a crystal curtain. Gaga continued with the dresses from the PBS special, with some changes during the tour. Her dress designer, Brandon Maxwell, explained that he and his team did the wardrobe for the dancers and Gaga. They first took references from director Robert Wilson regarding the set and lighting designs. The team then started with eight full racks of clothing, between 200 and 300 dresses, and afterwards zeroed in on eight costumes for the show, along with its accessories. Designers used for the costumes include Roberto Cavalli, Michael Costello, Mathieu Mirano, Valentino as well as David Samuel Menkes, who created the leather jumpsuit. Gaga had wanted costumes with teal or turquoise colours and flowing gowns, belted in the middle. Maxwell took care to ensure that the dresses were not too tight in Gaga's abdomen area, since it would have been difficult for her to sing. Sandals were provided by Brian Atwood, Stuart Weitzman and Sophia Webster, while a pair of boots were designed by Giuseppe Zanotti. They created custom made shoes which made Gaga appear tall and move freely in the long gowns. Gaga herself altered one of the halter dresses, denoting it as the "naked dress". During the tour, Bennett was accompanied by the Tony Bennett Quartet (which includes Mike Renzi) and Gaga with the Brian Newman Quintet.

Critical response

The Cheek to Cheek Tour generally received critical acclaim. Marc Graser from Variety called Lady Gaga and Tony Bennett "perfect dance partners". He was impressed with Gaga and Bennett's vocals, stating that the concert was "charmingly effective in showing off the talents of both artists on a stage simply decorated with crystal-studded curtains". Writing for Las Vegas Weekly, Mark Adams gave a positive review, saying that "every performance was flawless". He complimented the vocals of the duo and noted that "the two stars might be decades apart in age, but they're both at the top of their game now". Adams concluded his review saying "it seems like an odd pairing. But anyone who has heard these two true professionals sing together knows that it just works". Ashley Lee of The Hollywood Reporter defined the concert as "an effortlessly powerful Bennett and a respectfully restrained Gaga pair for a decadent set of standards". A review in The Vancouver Sun stated that the "duo lights up the Queen Elizabeth Theatre" and also praised Gaga's performance onstage as a "born entertainer".

Stuart Derdyn from The Seattle Times wrote that although neither Bennett's vocals nor Gaga's vocals were perfect, their solo performances were commendable. He also noticed the positive reaction from the audience, adding that "if there had been any more standing ovations, you could have mistaken [the show] for an aerobics class for the well-dressed." Writing for the San Jose Mercury News, critic Jim Harrington found the solo performances to be more appealing, adding that although Gaga added "shock factor" to the concert, she had commendable vocals to be on par with Bennett. Denny Directo from Entertainment Tonight reviewed the shows in Hollywood Bowl. He praised the whole concert and the duo's vocal ability, saying that "[Gaga] was born to perform the American Songbook" and "[Bennett] is a national treasure whose career spans over six decades and he's still got it". At the end he added, "These two are the real deal". Conversely, Barry Brecheisen from Orange County Register gave a more negative feedback of the show, saying that Gaga's singing ability was restrained and her untimely departures from the stage for costume changes were distracting. "That's all the more frustrating considering her solo spotlights were the evening's standouts, outshining the almost de rigueur standing ovations Bennett garnered", the reviewer added.

In London, Bennett canceled the tour's second show at the Royal Albert Hall because of coming down with a flu, hence only the first show was reviewed by the British media. Writing for The Daily Telegraph, journalist Neil McCormick rated the show with four out of five stars. He complimented the camaraderie between Bennett and Gaga, and believed that their vocals were most meaningful "on deep ballads like 'Nature Boy'". Caroline Sulivan from The Guardian rated the show same as McCormick and complimented some of the performances as being "great moments", including "I Can't Give You Anything But Love", "Nature Boy" and "I Won't Dance", as well as Gaga's cover of Édith Piaf's "La Vie en rose" and "Bang Bang". A same rating was given by Ludovic Hunter-Tilney from Financial Times who complimented Bennett's vocals but felt Gaga's solo performances "stole the show". Jim Farber from New York Daily News reviewed the first show out of four at Radio City Music Hall and described their live rapport as energetic and humorous. Stephen Holden from The New York Times gave a positive review, praising their vocals and the development of the show. He also noticed the difference between the performers on stage, specifically "Gaga's bright, saucy Broadway-trained voice and Mr. Bennett's mature saloon style". In another positive review, Chicago Tribune Howard Reich stated "Bennett and Gaga all but erased the decades separating them". Joe Lynch from Billboard gave a rating of 4 stars for Gaga and Bennett's stand-out vocal performances; he praised Gaga's delivery of "Bang Bang" and "La Vie en Rose" describing it as "astonished". The Cheek to Cheek Tour was ranked first in the Vulture list of the 10 best concerts of 2015.

Commercial reception

Jesse Lawrence from Forbes reported that there was high demand for the tickets, leading to additional dates being added to the itinerary. He also noted that the concerts had a much higher ticket price than the average, especially in the secondary markets. The first two dates were sold out immediately, with a high demand hence secondary market average price for New Year's Eve performance at The Chelsea was above $1,000 with a $329 get-in price for a limited quantity of tickets. The end-of-the-year concert was the most expensive show at Las Vegas, with tickets averaging at $647.58 and the get-in price starting at $239. For The Wiltern, ticket price was average $297.64 over a few hundred available tickets. Again, for the New York shows, all except the front row seats were sold out, leading to a third date being added on June 22, 2015. A similar situation occurred when tickets went on sale for their concert of June 8 at Royal Albert Hall in London, leading to an additional date to be added for June 9. Tickets for June 26–27 shows at the Ravinia Festival also sold out before them being available for general public.

In another article on Forbes, Lawrence wrote that there was a "massive" demand for tickets on the secondary market for Radio City Music Hall's shows. According to TiqIQ, the average secondary price was $380.83 with cheapest ones at $143, being the most expensive tickets on the tour in the United States. The total average was up by 50.5% throughout the 24 dates in the country, at $252.91. He also wrote about the show at Borgata Events Center in Atlantic City, which had tickets averaging $406.90 and the get-in price listed at $220. As it approached the final dates of the tour, there were more sold-out shows, with the average prices on the remaining dates and seats at $213.58. The Pollstar 2015 Mid-Year Top 100 Worldwide Tour list revealed Cheek to Cheek Tour as the 69th highest grosser, with a total of $13.1 million from 13 shows, and a total of 146,795 in attendance. At the end of 2015, the tour placed at number 71 on the Pollstar "2015 Year-End Top 200 North American Tours" list, grossing $15.3 million from 27 shows with a total attendance of 176,267.

Set list
This set list is representative of the show on June 19, 2015. It does not represent all dates throughout the tour.

"Anything Goes"
"Cheek to Cheek"
"They All Laughed"
"Stranger in Paradise" / "Sing, You Sinners" 
"Nature Boy"
"The Good Life" 
"Bang Bang (My Baby Shot Me Down)" 
"Bewitched, Bothered and Bewildered" 
"Firefly"
"Smile" / "When You're Smiling" 
"For Once in My Life" 
"I Won't Dance"
"The Lady's in Love with You"
"(In My) Solitude"
"I Can't Give You Anything But Love"
"Lush Life" 
"I've Got the World on a String" / "In the Wee Small Hours of the Morning" 
"How Do You Keep the Music Playing?" 
"Let's Face the Music and Dance"
"Ev'ry Time We Say Goodbye" 
"Who Cares?" 
"I Left My Heart in San Francisco" 
"But Beautiful"
"The Lady Is a Tramp"
Encore
"It Don't Mean a Thing (If It Ain't Got That Swing)"

Shows

Cancellations

Box office score data

Notes

References

External links

 Official website

2014 concert tours
2015 concert tours
Co-headlining concert tours
Lady Gaga concert tours
Concert tours of North America
Concert tours of Europe
Concert tours of the United States
Concert tours of Canada
Concert tours of the United Kingdom
Concert tours of Switzerland
Concert tours of Denmark
Concert tours of the Netherlands
Concert tours of Belgium
Concert tours of Italy
Concert tours of Spain